Amadou Boiro (15 December 1995 – 30 June 2019) was a Senegalese footballer who played as a defensive midfielder.

Club career
Boiro represented Ndangane Foot, ASC Linguère and Casa Sports back in his homeland. On 1 September 2016 he signed for Spanish Segunda División club Gimnàstic de Tarragona; initially assigned to the farm team in Tercera División, he officially joined the team in October.

Boiro made his professional debut on 12 November 2016, coming on as a late substitute for goalscorer Juan Muñiz in a 1–0 home win against Getafe CF; it was his maiden appearance for the club. The following August, he was released by the club and moved to Albania, signing with KF Laçi.

Death
On 30 June 2019, Boiro's former club Casa Sports announced his death; it was later announced that he died in Turkey due to a "short illness".

References

External links

1995 births
2019 deaths
People from Ziguinchor
Senegalese footballers
Association football midfielders
ASC Linguère players
Casa Sports players
Segunda División players
Gimnàstic de Tarragona footballers
KF Laçi players
Senegalese expatriate footballers
Senegalese expatriate sportspeople in Spain
Senegalese expatriate sportspeople in Turkey
Expatriate footballers in Spain
Expatriate footballers in Albania
Expatriate footballers in Turkey